Vyrnwy may mean:
Lake Vyrnwy (Llyn Efyrnwy)
River Vyrnwy (Afon Efyrnwy)

Both the river and the lake are located in Powys, Wales.